Oswalt Kolle (2 October 1928, in Kiel – 24 September 2010, in Amsterdam) was a German sex educator, who became famous during the late 1960s and early 1970s for his numerous pioneering books and films on human sexuality. His work was translated into all major languages, while his films found an audience of 140 million worldwide. In his 1997 book Open to Both Sides he came out as bisexual.

He was awarded the Magnus Hirschfeld Medal in 2000.

He had lived in the relatively more sexually liberal city of Amsterdam, Netherlands since the 1970s with his three children to escape harassment of his family by conservative German journalists, and was also a Dutch citizen. His wife died in 2000.

References

External links

1928 births
2010 deaths
Bisexual men
Bisexual writers
German emigrants to the Netherlands
German sexologists
Dutch LGBT writers
German LGBT writers
Writers from Kiel
Sex educators
German male writers